The Last Crossing is a novel by Canadian writer Guy Vanderhaeghe. It was first published in 2002 by McClelland and Stewart.

A rethinking of the genre of the "western", The Last Crossing is a tale of interwoven lives and stories taking place in the last half of the 19th century, travelling from England to the United States and the Canadian west.

Awards and nominations
The Last Crossing was one of the selected books in the 2004 edition of Canada Reads, championed by musician Jim Cuddy. The Last Crossing eventually won the competition. 
Nominated, International Dublin Literary Award (2004)

External links
 The Last Crossing at McClelland & Stewart
 IMPAC Dublin Literary Award citation for The Last Crossing

2002 American novels
Novels by Guy Vanderhaeghe
Western (genre) novels
Secret histories
Novels set in the United States
Novels set in England
Novels set in Saskatchewan
Canadian Western novels
McClelland & Stewart books
Novels set in the 19th century